Marcus Ulpius Traianus (c. AD 29 – before 98) was a Roman senator who lived in the first century. He was father to the Roman Emperor Trajan.

Family
Traianus belonged to a family of the gens Ulpia, which originally came from the Umbrian city of Tuder, but he was born and raised in the Roman colony of Italica, north of modern Santiponce and northwest of Seville, in the Roman Province of Hispania Baetica. The town was founded in 206 BC by Scipio Africanus, as a settlement for wounded and invalid veterans of the wars against Carthage. The Ulpii, like the Aelii and the Traii, were among the leading Roman families of the city. From the latter family came the ancestors of Traianus, who intermarried with the Ulpii, giving rise to the cognomen Traianus. Since the father of Traianus joined the ranks of the senators in Rome, it is very likely that his grandfather was already a member of the Roman Senate. The ancestry of Traianus' mother is unknown. His sister Ulpia was the mother of Publius Aelius Hadrianus Afer, and grandmother of the emperor Hadrian. Traianus married a Roman noblewoman named Marcia. She was the elder sister of Marcia Furnilla, the second wife of Titus, which enabled her to further her husband's career. They had two children: a daughter, Ulpia Marciana, and a son, Marcus, the future emperor Trajan.

Career
The chronology of Traianus' career is uncertain.  He may have taken his seat in the senate by the reign of Claudius. In the time of Nero, he may have commanded a legion under the general Gnaeus Domitius Corbulo; during the First Jewish-Roman War, from AD 67 to 68, he came into favour with the future emperor Vespasian, then governor of Judaea, under whom he commanded the Tenth Legion.  After his accession to the Empire, Vespasian recognized Traianus' military successes by awarding him the governorship of Cappadocia, and naming him consul suffectus for the months of September and October in AD 72. After his consulship, Trajan served as governor of Syria from 73 to 74, then proconsul of Asia from 79 to 80.  He was also governor of Hispania Baetica, but the time of this appointment is unknown. During his time in Syria, Traianus prevented a Parthian invasion.

Legacy
Traianus lived out his final years in honor and distinction. Indirect evidence suggests that he may have died before his son became emperor in AD 98. Around 100, his son founded a colony in North Africa, named Colonia Marciana Ulpia Trajana Thamugadi after his father; today the town is known as Timgad, in Algeria.  In 113, the elder Traianus was deified by his son, and his titulature is Divus Traianus Pater.

See also
 Ulpia gens

Notes

References

Citations

Works cited

General sources
 
 

20s births
1st-century deaths
Year of birth uncertain
Year of death uncertain
1st-century Roman governors of Syria
Ancient Roman politicians
Nerva–Antonine dynasty
Traianus, Marcus
Senators of the Roman Empire
Suffect consuls of Imperial Rome
Roman governors of Asia
Roman governors of Syria
1st-century Romans
Romans from Hispania
Deified Roman people